, formally titled the Kanagawa Prefectural Kanazawa-Bunko Museum, is a museum located in Kanazawa Ward, Yokohama, Japan. It features a collection of traditional Japanese and Chinese art objects, many dating from the Kamakura period.

Originally built as a private library, Kanazawa Bunko was one of the two most important centers of learning in medieval Japan, with Ashikaga Gakkō being the other. The library was opened in 1275 by Hōjō Sanetoki (1224–76), a grandson of Hōjō Yoshitoki, second regent of the Kamakura shogunate. The library's collection has not remained intact, although some original documents remain. The existing building, built in 1990, houses the existing collection.

Kanazawa Bunko shares its name with Kanazawa-Bunko Station, which is a limited express stop station on the Keikyu Main Line of Keikyu Railways.

Western side of the Temple garden with the pond is another open space, whose hill has two tunnels. One is closed with meshed wires. Another leads us to Kanazawa-Bunko Museum. The space at the mouth of the tunnels had a chateau of Kanazawa-Hōjō clan. Hōjō Sanetoki was a skilled politician and a dilettante who was already famous for his intelligence when he was ten years old. Sanetoki started to collect books and in 1275 built the first organized library in Japan (for private use, of course). He built the archive not next to his chateau, but another side of the hill separated by the fireproof hardpan. For the convenience of the book owner, they dug a tunnel to connect two properties which is now covered by the wire-mesh for safety. Sanetoki 実時 treasured the books and thought the contingency “just in case.” His son (Akitoki 顕時), his grandson (Sada’aki 貞顕), and his great-grandson (Sadayuki 貞将 who was killed in 1333) were also functioned as “Lord Chamberlain” for Kamakura Government, which made them study traditional culture of Kyoto deeply as their dad / grandpa. With their power and money, they continued to amass many fine books at the time. Their love for learning and caution were paid off. Even after their family was extinct, the library survived and was maintained by Shōmyōji Temple that became a seminary. From time to time the grandees of Japanese politics supported Shōmyōji Temple to maintain the facility … some of them requested the return for their help. Tokugawa Ieyasu 徳川家康 moved huge volumes from Kanazawa Bunko to Edo Castle (the current Imperial Palace). The PM Itoh returned the books taken by Ieyasu to Kanazawa Bunko in the late 19th century. In 1930 the place became the Central Library of Kanagawa Prefecture by the national law. In 1954, it became Kanagawa Prefectural Kanazawa-Bunko Museum specialized in historical documents and artefacts. The treasures of the Museum includes 5 National Treasures; portraits of 4 chiefs of Kanazawa-Hōjō clan, and the only remaining copy in the world for The Wen Xuan 文選, the 5th century anthology of classic Chinese poems composed in BC. (It is considered that it was hand-copied in the 9th to 10th century.) The place is an information center for researchers of Japanese Middle Age, publishes an academic journal (“金沢文庫研究 Kanazawa Bunko Kenkyu,” May 1955 -), and organizes numerous symposiums, lecture series, and exhibition for Japanese history. At the moment, they collaborate with Yūgyōji Temple 遊行寺 in Fujisawa City for an exhibition of a national treasure, Ippen Hijiri-E (一遍聖絵 “The pictured story of Saint Ippen”) until December 13, 2015.

Notes

Museums in Yokohama
Art museums and galleries in Japan
Libraries established in the 13th century
1270s establishments in Japan
1275 establishments in Asia